is a passenger railway station located in the city of Komatsushima, Tokushima Prefecture, Japan. It is operated by JR Shikoku and has the station number "M07".

Lines
Only local trains stop at the station.

Layout
The station consists of a side platform serving a single track. A simple metal structure in a modern style serves as a waiting room by the platform. A large bike shed is available outside the station but a fee is required for parking. The station is unstaffed but the staff at the shelter managing the bikeshed also sell some kinds of tickets as a kan'i itaku agent.

Adjacent stations

History
Awa-Akaishi Station was opened on 15 December 1916 as Akaishi Station. On 1 July 1936, the Anan Railway was nationalized. Japanese Government Railways (JGR) took over control of the station, renamed it Awa-Akaishi and operated it as part of the Mugi Line. On 1 April 1987, with the privatization of Japanese National Railways (JNR), the successor of JGR, control of the station passed to JR Shikoku.

Passenger statistics
In fiscal 2018, the station was used by an average of 678 passengers daily

Surrounding area
Komatsushima City Shinkai Elementary School
Komatsushima City Komatsushima Minami Junior High School
JMSDF Komatsushima Air Base

See also
 List of Railway Stations in Japan

References

External links

 JR Shikoku official homepage

Railway stations in Tokushima Prefecture
Railway stations in Japan opened in 1916
Komatsushima, Tokushima